Fuxian may refer to the following locations in China:

 Fuxian Lake (抚仙湖), in Yunnan, the second deepest freshwater lake in China
 Fu County or Fuxian (富县), Shaanxi
 Wafangdian, formerly Fuxian or Fu County (复县), Liaoning
 Fuxian, Shuangliao (服先镇), town in Jilin